PDPA can refer to: 

People's Democratic Party of Afghanistan – a communist party
Personal Data Protection Act 2012 – a Singapore law governing the use and protection of personal data
Professional Dart Players Association – a trade association for darts players